Carry On is the second solo studio album by American musician Chris Cornell. It was released on May 28, 2007, in the United Kingdom and June 5, 2007, in the United States. This album is Cornell's second after Euphoria Mourning in 1999, and his first since leaving his former band Audioslave. As of September 4, 2007, the album has sold 121,000 copies in the US and 300,000 copies worldwide.

Production

Recording history
Carry On was produced by Steve Lillywhite. Among the artists who accompanied Cornell on his second solo release was friend Gary Lucas, who contributed acoustic guitar to some of the tracks. Cornell has stated that he is always writing, and that there are some songs that he was not able to put onto an Audioslave album. While recording his second solo album, Cornell was involved in a motorcycle accident. He was apparently "rear-ended by a truck in L.A.'s Studio City while riding his motorcycle" and "catapulted 20 feet into the air." He was able to walk away from the accident, but had severe cuts and bruises. He returned to the studio later that day.

Musical style
The album's style has been described as "a mash-up of alt-rock and adult contemporary." AllMusic critic Stephen Thomas Erlewine considered the album as "a hard rock maturation." Cornell stated that he took influences from a variety of genres including heavy rock on the recording of Carry On.

Reception
The album debuted at number 17 on the Billboard 200, selling 37,000 copies in the United States. Carry On received generally mixed reviews from music critics. The BBC described it as "possibly the most confused album you’ll come across all year ... a collection that is both catchy and dreary at the same time." Cornell announced that "No Such Thing" would be the album's first single during interviews with various radio stations around the United States.

Track listing 
The album features fourteen tracks, including the first album appearance of "You Know My Name", the theme song for Casino Royale, the 2006 installment in the James Bond franchise. The album also features a cover of Michael Jackson's hit song from Thriller, "Billie Jean".

All songs written by Chris Cornell, except where noted.

Personnel
Personnel adapted from Carry On liner notes.

Musicians
 Chris Cornell - lead vocals (all tracks), guitar (all tracks), keyboard (track 12)
 Gary Lucas - guitar (tracks 3–14)
 Jamie Muhoberac - keyboards (tracks 2, and 5–9)
 Miles Mosley - bass guitar (tracks 1–7, 9–12, and 14), upright bass (tracks 8 and 13)
 Nir Zidkyahu - drums (all tracks)
 Cameron Greider - guitar (tracks 3–6, and 8–13)
 Brian Ray - guitar (tracks 1, 2, 7, 9, and 10)
 Dimitri Coats - guitar (tracks 2, 7, and 10)
 Steve Lillywhite - piano (track 10)
 Joe Sublett - tenor saxophone (track 4)
 Darrell Leonard - trumpet (track 4)
 Dave Cobb - horn arrangements (track 4)

Production
 Steve Lillywhite - production, mixing
 Todd Parker - recording, mixing
 David Colving - additional engineering
 Stephen Marcusson - mastering
 Cindi Peters - production coordination
 D. Sardy - mixing (track 14)
 Ryan Castle - engineering (track 14)
 Cameron Barton - additional engineering (track 14)

Charts

Release history

References

2007 albums
Albums produced by Steve Lillywhite
Chris Cornell albums
Interscope Records albums